R&R Films or R & R Films may refer to:

Associated R&R Films, first known as R&R Films, an Australian film company established in 1980 by Robert Stingwood and Rupert Murdoch, with its first and only project being the 1981 film Gallipoli

 R&R Films (later R&R Film), a British film company set up in 2010 by Robert Cavanah and Royd Tolkien

R & R Films, an Australian film distribution company established in 2018 by Richard Becker and Robert Slaviero